Fani may refer to:
 Fani, Mali, a town in Mali
 Fani, one of the Asia Islands in eastern Indonesia
 Cyclone Fani, a North Indian Ocean tropical cyclone in 2019

People with the name 
 Fani Badayuni (1879-1961), Urdu poet
 Fani Chalkia (born 1979), Greek athlete
 Fani Madida (born 1966), South African footballer
 Fani Papageorgiou (born 1975), Greek poet and critic
 Fani Stipković (born 1982), Croatian television reporter
 Fani Willis, US district attorney for the Fulton County, Georgia
 Jamshid Fani, Iranian boxer
 Leonora Fani (born 1954), Italian film actress
 Mohsin Fani, 17th-century Persian historian
 Nadia El Fani (born 1960), French-Tunisian film director

See also 
 Fanni (disambiguation)
 Fany (disambiguation)
 Fanny (disambiguation)
 Fannie
 Feni (disambiguation)